Curt Stoermer (born Kurt Karl August Störmer, 26 April 189129 January 1976) was a German painter, a representative of the Worpswede branch of expressionist art.

Biography
Born in Hagen in 1891, Stoermer was influenced in his youth by the opening of the Museum Folkwang Karl Ernst Osthaus (which he attended), and learned from Christian Rohlfs. He started studying at the Kunstakademie Düsseldorf in 1908, later moving to Paris to study there, attending the Académie Colarossi. In Paris he visited the artist Amedeo Modigliani, whose work he later described as impressive. He met fellow radical Heinrich Vogeler at school, and went with him to Worpswede in 1912. He catalogued the estate of the late Paula Modersohn-Becker, and published his first woodcuts, including in the magazine Der Sturm, as well as painted. In October that year he held his first exhibition at the Museum Folkwang.

During the First World War, Stoermer was drafted into the Imperial German Army, serving in the Oldenburg Dragoons (Oldenburgisches Dragoner-Regiment Nr. 19). He was wounded in combat. In the aftermath of the war, he participated in the German Revolution of 1918-1919, joining the workers' and soldiers' council of the Bremen Soviet Republic. He became People's Commissar of press and propaganda, together with the editor Alfred Faust. When the Army and Freikorps Caspari descended on the city to put down the revolt, Stoermer went into hiding.

After 1921 he lived and worked in Lübeck, interrupted only by two journeys to East Asia as a sailor of the merchant marine, undertaken due to financial difficulties. Inspired by Ervin Bossányi and promoted by the glazier Carl Berkentien, he turned to glass painting. Among other artwork, he made glass windows for the memorial chapel Aegidienkirche (inspired by Wilhelm Jannasch, and destroyed in 1942 by a land mine blast), the Ratskeller zu Lübeck, Heiligen-Geist-Hospital, and St. Andreas Church in Lübeck.

In 1931 he gained a scholarship from the Villa Massimo through Prussian Academy of Arts, which enabled him to go on a prolonged trip to Dalmatia and Rome. There he met and befriended Werner Gilles, who gave him a decisive impetus for the development of his artistic style. The following year he formed the art group Werkgruppe Lübeck, together with Harry Maasz, Wilhelm Bräck, Alfred Mahlau, Hans Peters, Alen Müller-Hellwig, and Emil Steffann. Due to the National Socialist artist Asmus Jessen he received no public contracts after the rise of the Third Reich, and four of his woodcuts at the Folkwang Museum were confiscated as "degenerate art".

After the destruction of his Lübeck studio by an Allied bomb attack in 1942, he moved to a property in Utecht, by Ratzeburger See. After the end of the Second World War Stoermer received several contracts for the decoration of public buildings, mainly to restore wartime damages, such as the Thomas-Mann-Schule and the Landesversicherungsanstalt and the Mengstraße police station. His sgraffito was found on many apartment blocks in Lübeck-Eichholz during the 1950s. Stoermer created a wealth of watercolors and drawings, particularly depicting his many travels in the Mediterranean Sea. He also worked as a critic for the Lübecker Freie Presse, a Social Democratic newspaper.

Bibliography

 
 
 

People from Hagen
Kunstakademie Düsseldorf alumni
Académie Julian alumni
German Expressionist painters
20th-century German painters
German stained glass artists and manufacturers
German sailors
German Army personnel of World War I
People of the German Revolution of 1918–1919
German revolutionaries
Prussian Academy of Arts alumni
Académie Colarossi alumni
1891 births
1976 deaths
20th-century German male artists
German male painters